Tigran Barseghyan (born 22 September 1993) is an Armenian professional football player who plays as a winger for Fortuna League side Slovan Bratislava and the Armenia national team.

Club career
Born in Armenian capital Yerevan, Barsegyan played with FC Banants, FC Gandzasar Kapan and FC Mika in the Armenian Premier League. On 30 August 2016, he moved abroad and signed with Macedonian side FK Vardar where his national teammate Hovhannes Hambardzumyan is already playing.

After two-and-a-half seasons at FK Vardar, considered to be one of the best foreign players to play in Macedonian First Football League by media such as gol.mk due to visa problems, he left the club, seeking a new one at the beginning of 2019.

On 24 January 2020, FC Astana announced the signing of Barseghyan to a two-year contract.

On 24 November 2021, Slovan Bratislava announced the signing of Barseghyan to a contract.

International career
Barseghyan played with the Armenia U21 national team in 2014. In 2016, he made his debut for the senior national team. He participated in the 2018–19 UEFA Nations League. He scored a goal to tie a Nations League match against Liechtenstein, with his team ultimately winning. He scored the winning goal on a penalty against Romania.

Career statistics

Club

International

Scores and results list Armenia's goal tally first, score column indicates score after each Barseghyan goal.

Honours
Banants Yerevan
Armenian Premier League runner-up: 2010–11, 2011–12
Armenian Cup runner-up: 2009–10, 2010–11
Armenian Super Cup runner-up: 2010–11

Mika
Armenian Cup runner-up: 2014–15

Vardar
Macedonian First League: 2016–17

Slovan Bratislava
 Fortuna Liga: 2021–22

References

1993 births
Living people
Footballers from Yerevan
Armenian footballers
Armenia international footballers
Armenia under-21 international footballers
Armenian expatriate footballers
Association football midfielders
FC Urartu players
FC Gandzasar Kapan players
FC Mika players
FK Vardar players
FC Kaisar players
FC Astana players
ŠK Slovan Bratislava players
Armenian Premier League players
Macedonian First Football League players
Kazakhstan Premier League players
Slovak Super Liga players
Expatriate footballers in North Macedonia
Expatriate footballers in Kazakhstan
Armenian expatriate sportspeople in Kazakhstan
Expatriate footballers in Slovakia
Armenian expatriate sportspeople in Slovakia